Matthew Kilroy was a soldier of the 29th Regiment of Foot who was present at the Boston Massacre. He killed one man and was found guilty of manslaughter.

Boston Massacre
On 5 March 1770, 7 British soldiers, including Kilroy, were dispatched to King Street in Boston, Massachusetts to relieve Private Hugh White. A large crowd soon gathered around them. After Private Hugh Montgomery was struck by a club, Montgomery shouted, "Damn you, fire!" Kilroy then pointed his gun at rope-maker Gray, who, depending on the source, said, "damn you, don't fire!" or "They dare not fire."

Kilroy then fired the shot that killed Gray. The ball passed through Gray's head and "opened up a hole as big as a man's fist." Several witnesses said that, afterwards, Kilroy's bayonet was covered with blood.

A few days before the massacre, Kilroy had argued with Gray at Gray's Rope-works. Kilroy had also, according to one witness, said that "he would never miss an opportunity... to fire on the inhabitants."

On 27 March, Kilroy was indicted for murder. He was held in prison pending trial, which took place in November and December 1770, in Boston. John Adams, who would later become President of the United States, was his attorney.

Kilroy and Montgomery were both found guilty of manslaughter on 5 December. They returned to court nine days later and pleaded "benefit of clergy" to avoid the death sentence. Instead, they were branded on the thumb, with a hot iron, the letter "M" for murder. The two reportedly burst into tears before receiving the punishment.

Kilroy was illiterate.

Kilroy was a main character of the book The Fifth of March by author Ann Rinaldi.

References

Worcestershire Regiment soldiers
British people convicted of manslaughter
People acquitted of murder
Year of birth uncertain
British mass murderers
Year of death unknown
Boston Massacre